Sarah Smith (born 1947) is an American author living in Brookline, Massachusetts.

Life
She holds a B.A. and a Ph.D. in English literature, both from Harvard. She was an Assistant Professor of English for several years before going to work in the computer industry. She has worked for Lisp Machines Inc., Bachman Inc., ITP Systems, Inc., and Effective Educational Tech which was acquired by Pearson Education in 2006.

She is the author of a three-novel historical mystery series set in turn of the century Boston and Paris about amnesiac Alexander von Reisden. She has also authored King of Space, a work of speculative fiction published as a hypertext novel by Eastgate Systems, Inc. in 1991, that places her among the pioneers of electronic literature.

Awards 
 Fulbright fellow 1968-69
 Mellon fellow, 1977
 named Woman of Year, The College Club of Boston, 1997.

Works
 
 
 
 Chasing Shakespeares Atria Books, 2003, 
 The Other Side of Dark Atheneum, 2010,

Hypertext novel

Anthologies 

 The Boys Go Fishing (Aug 2010) in Death's Excellent Vacation

References

External links 
  Interstitial Art Foundation

 LibraryThing author profile
Author's website

1947 births
Living people
20th-century American novelists
21st-century American novelists
Agatha Award winners
American mystery writers
American Quakers
American science fiction writers
American women short story writers
American women novelists
Harvard University alumni
Writers from Brookline, Massachusetts
Writers of historical mysteries
Women science fiction and fantasy writers
Women mystery writers
20th-century American women writers
21st-century American women writers
Women historical novelists
20th-century American short story writers
21st-century American short story writers
Electronic literature writers
Fulbright alumni